Chronic Town is the debut EP by American alternative rock band R.E.M., released on August 24, 1982, on I.R.S. Records. Containing five tracks, the EP was recorded at the Drive-In Studio in Winston-Salem, North Carolina, in October 1981, eighteen months after the formation of the band. Its co-producer was Mitch Easter, who produced the band's "Radio Free Europe" single earlier in 1981.

Chronic Towns opening track, "Wolves, Lower", was re-recorded in June 1982, two months before the EP's release.

Background and recording
After the minor success of the group's debut single "Radio Free Europe" in 1981, R.E.M. manager Jefferson Holt felt the band was ready to record a longer release. While he felt they were not ready to record a full album, Holt figured an EP would be satisfactory. The band was uncertain at first if they would record with producer Mitch Easter (who had produced "Radio Free Europe"), but Easter managed to convince Holt and the band to let him produce it.

In October 1981, R.E.M. spent a weekend at Easter's Drive-In Studios recording the EP. Easter was a fan of the electronic band Kraftwerk, which inspired him to try various sonic experiments while recording. Easter incorporated tape loops and recorded singer Michael Stipe singing outdoors. The band was open to such experimentation and used the sessions as an opportunity to learn how to use a studio.

R.E.M. intended to release the EP on a proposed independent record label named Dasht Hopes run by Holt and his business partner David Healy. However, the band's demo had caught the attention of I.R.S. Records. The label signed the group to a record deal, working the band out of its contracts with Healy and Hib-Tone, the indie label which released "Radio Free Europe". I.R.S. heads Jay Boberg and Miles Copeland III felt the proposed track listing was weakened by the song "Ages of You", and felt "Wolves, Lower" was a better choice. However, the pair felt the original take of the song was too fast. The band re-recorded "Wolves, Lower" with Easter in June 1982 in a quick recording session.

Packaging
The album's front cover depicts a blue gargoyle with its tongue extended.

Release
I.R.S. released Chronic Town in August 1982 as its first American release. Reaction to the EP varied; one I.R.S. radio promoter said that many of his contacts at campus radio did not know what to make of the record, but added, "The Georgia stations and some of the more together college stations across the country jumped on it." The band filmed its first music video for "Wolves, Lower" to promote the record. The EP sold 20,000 copies in its first year.

Reception

NME reviewer Richard Grabel wrote, "Chronic Town is five songs that spring to life full of immediacy and action and healthy impatience. Songs that won't be denied." Grabel praised the songs' auras of mystery, and concluded, "R.E.M. ring true, and it's great to hear something as unforced and cunning as this." Creem writer Robot A. Hull began his review saying, "This EP is so arcane that I had to play it six times in a row to get a handle on it – and even now, I'm still not sure." Hull praised the EP for "[evoking] the music of the late-'60s without any pretensions, mingling past and present to shape both into concurrent moments." Hull concluded, "Despite its eccentricity, R.E.M.'s record is undoubtedly the sleeper EP of the year."

Chronic Town ranked second in the EP category of the Village Voice Pazz & Jop critics' poll in 1982.

For Record Store Day 2010, held on April 17 of that year, participating independent record stores sold a limited-edition and individually-numbered blue vinyl 12" reissue of the long-out of print EP.

Track listing
All songs written by Bill Berry, Peter Buck, Mike Mills and Michael Stipe.

Side one – "Chronic Town"
"Wolves, Lower" – 4:10
"Gardening at Night" – 3:29
"Carnival of Sorts (Boxcars)" – 3:54

Side two – "Poster Torn"
"1,000,000" – 3:06
"Stumble" – 5:40

Personnel
R.E.M.
Bill Berry – drums, vocals
Peter Buck – guitar
Mike Mills – bass guitar, vocals
Michael Stipe – vocals

Production
Greg Calbi – mastering at Sterling Sound, New York City, United States
Mitch Easter – production, engineering
Kako .n. – graphics
Curtis Knapp – cover photography
R.A. Miller – artwork
R.E.M. – production
Ron Scarselli – design

Release history
The EP was added to the CD edition of the band's rarities compilation album Dead Letter Office (1987), and again in 1993 in the I.R.S. Vintage Years edition of the compilation. In 2014, it was digitally remastered solely for online purchase from select high-resolution digital music stores. It is also available on analog formats such as LP and cassette.

It was bundled together with Murmur and Reckoning in the United Kingdom as The Originals in 1995. The album also saw a standalone CD reissue on August 19, 2022, featuring liner notes written by producer Mitch Easter, marking the first CD release of the EP not tied to a compilation.

Chronic Town

Dead Letter Office

Note
†I.R.S. Vintage Years edition, with bonus tracks

The Originals

References

Works cited

External links
 
 

1982 debut EPs
Albums produced by Bill Berry
Albums produced by Michael Stipe
Albums produced by Mike Mills
Albums produced by Mitch Easter
Albums produced by Peter Buck
Garage rock EPs
R.E.M. EPs
I.R.S. Records EPs
1982 debut albums